Art Wallace was an American television writer best known for his work on the gothic soap opera Dark Shadows. He began work in television in the 1940s, on the anthology series Studio One and Kraft Television Theater. Over the years, Wallace wrote for Tom Corbett, Space Cadet, Combat!, Star Trek, and many other shows.  The teleplay on which Dark Shadows was based was called "The House" and was an episode of the anthology series Goodyear Playhouse in 1957. When Dan Curtis had the idea for Dark Shadows, he offered the job of producer to Art Wallace, who declined the job. Wallace offered to write the show and recommended Robert Costello for the job of producer. In 1966, working with Dan Curtis he wrote the bible and first eight weeks' worth of early episodes of Dark Shadows. He wrote the next nine weeks of shows alternating with film writer Francis Swann.

Wallace was also a story consultant for the soap opera All My Children. His wife, Elizabeth Wallace, was a script writer on AMC during the 1980s.

Art Wallace was also known as the author of "Toby" which was used as reading material in elementary schools throughout the seventies and eighties, and less frequently up to today. 
"Toby" was re-released with new cover art as "Toby and the Phantoms of the Fourth Grade" just after his death.

He died in 1994.

Filmography

Films

Television

External links

American soap opera writers
American male television writers
Year of birth missing (living people)
Living people